The National Museum of Commercial Aviation (NMCA) was the nation's first comprehensive airline industry museum in the United States. It was located in Forest Park, Georgia, just south of Atlanta and Hartsfield-Jackson International Airport. It was founded in 2006 by Executive Director & Chief Curator Grant Wainscott. It was a public 501(c)3 not-for-profit organization, and was governed by a 12-member Board of Trustees, chaired by Captain Chuck Maire Jr. The NMCA was a collaborative effort between the non-profit Museum, local and regional governments, and hundreds of business, aviation and community partners throughout the country.  The museum was closed with intentions of moving to a new location, but never reopened.  The museum dissolved as an organization in 2016.

History

In 2003, a group of retired airline employees and civic leaders met to discuss creating a lasting legacy to the commercial airlines that helped make Atlanta home to the busiest airport in the world.  From this initial conversation, a national movement was born, resulting in what is now known as the National Museum of Commercial Aviation (NMCA).

The NMCA is the first comprehensive airline industry museum in the United States, and is poised to become the nation's premier center for airline history and research, attracting visitors from around the globe.  It is being designed to become a major tourism attraction and economic generator for the region, and to serve as a cultural and educational amenity for residents and visitors alike.  The museum will take a broad look at all aspects of the airline industry, not just one particular airline or airport, covering everything from the birth of the airline industry to modern labor relations; from air mail to air cargo; highlighting every job in the industry and its value. Most importantly, it will preserve the artifacts and stories of the men and women who built the industry to what it is today.
	
In 2007, after years of research and planning, the museum selected and subsequently announced south metro Atlanta as its permanent home, followed by a major operating grant award from Clayton County, Georgia to assist with planning, research & other operating needs. As a result of growing public demand, and interest from the aviation community, the first Interim Headquarters & Research Air-Chive was opened in Forest Park, Georgia in March 2008.  The Interim H.Q. was designed to act as both temporary museum and sales center to give the public an idea of what to expect further down the road, and immediately became a success.

More than 4,000 visitors came through the doors in the first 14 months open, and the demand for public programming, group tours, children's educational programming and additional exhibits necessitated a move into a much larger facility adjacent to the existing site. The current location serves as the center of operations for the museum, until the much larger main campus is built. The Interim Museum is open to the public, and contains various airline exhibits, an art gallery, children's activity center, research library, flight simulators and a gift shop. Educational and public programming efforts include an award-winning children's book club, monthly lecture series, traveling exhibits and rotating art gallery.

The first phase of the Permanent Campus located at 727 Airline Museum Way, Atlanta, Georgia 30354, is a 16,000-sf hangar which will house twelve new exhibits, cockpits and ground support equipment, the museum's growing collection, staff and volunteers. It is expected to open in 2013.

Facilities

Adjacent to the entrance corridor of the new international terminal under construction at the world's busiest airport, and in the shadow of the world's largest airline, the museum is preparing to break ground on the first phase of what will eventually become a 150,000-sf campus of buildings, aircraft, support vehicles, interactive exhibits, educational classrooms and learning labs, and memorial gardens.

Extremely good visibility from more than 800-ft of frontage on Interstate 75, direct & easy access to the airport, and tens of thousands of aviation employees in the immediate area will add to the feasibility of a "national" museum. The museum Main Campus will consist of several buildings, built in phases over a number of years. Main buildings will include a themed airport terminal covering the major decades of aviation, complete with loading bridges and full-size commercial airliners outside. Adjacent hangars and a first-of-its-kind Career Exploration & Learning Center will contain additional aircraft, classrooms and career exploration areas, theaters, archives and collections storage, themed cafeteria, and a restoration/maintenance shop.

The museum's vast array of interactive, high-tech and hands-on exhibits will help to: (1) Preserve American culture and heritage through historic aircraft and exhibits and by serving as a national archive for commercial aviation; (2) Empower youth in their formative years to connect with careers in aviation by providing a pivotal, hands-on experience, and (3) Connect the visitor to the past, present and future of air travel through interactive educational programming, and engaging displays of the early dreamers and risk takers all the way to today's corporate culture, engaging displays from the early dreamers and risk takers to today's corporate boardrooms. Special attention will be paid to the significant contributions of women, African-Americans and other important groups that make up the diverse landscape that is America.

Collection

The museum has a rapidly growing collection of more than 100,000 artifacts. Major concentrations include 500 uniforms dating as far back as the 1930s, advertising memorabilia, rare cockpits and trainers, 2,500 pieces of in-flight serving ware, vintage toys and models, and original artwork.

Most noteworthy in the collection include the world's only known Martin 404 Cockpit Procedures Trainer (CPT) in Southern Airways livery, TUG Technologies first TUG Tractor, and the cockpit of an ex Eastern Air Lines Martin 404, later owned by Ray Charles. The museum's aircraft collection includes a former United Airlines/FedEx Express Boeing 727, and a former FedEx Express/Mountain Air Cargo Fokker F-27 Friendship.

In 2013, aviation airliner artist Marc Y. Chenevert began searching for a repository to donate his vast airliner and art collection. Associates suggested to Chenevert that he contact the National Museum of Commercial Aviation and was introduced to Richard Grigg, NMCA Curator.  The museum was highly interested in Marc's aviation collection and in August 2013, Grigg traveled to Chenevert's home in Asheville, North Carolina to accept the donation of his non Braniff International Airways airliner drawings Collection. The museum will also receive Chenevert's drawing desk and tools that he has used since the early 1970s.  Chenevert's Braniff International Airways Collection has been donated to Braniff Flying Colors Collection based in Dallas, Texas.

References

External links
National Museum of Commercial Aviation - Home site

Aerospace museums in Georgia (U.S. state)
Braniff
Museums in Clayton County, Georgia
Defunct museums in Georgia (U.S. state)
Museums established in 2006
Museums disestablished in 2016